Grace Lee Boggs (June 27, 1915 – October 5, 2015) was an American author, social activist, philosopher, and feminist. She is known for her years of political collaboration with C. L. R. James and Raya Dunayevskaya in the 1940s and 1950s.  In the 1960s, she and James Boggs, her husband of some forty years, took their own political direction. By 1998, she had written four books, including an autobiography. In 2011, still active at the age of 95, she wrote a fifth book, The Next American Revolution: Sustainable Activism for the Twenty-First Century, with Scott Kurashige and published by the University of California Press. She is regarded as a key figure in the Asian American, Black Power, and Civil Rights movements.

Family and childhood

Early life 
Boggs was born on June 27, 1915, in Providence, Rhode Island, above her father's restaurant. Her Chinese given name was Yu Ping (玉平), meaning "Jade Peace." She was the daughter of Chin Lee (1870–1965) and his second wife, Yin Lan Ng. Both her parents were originally from Taishan, Guangdong in Qing dynasty China. Bogg's siblings include one sister, Katherine, and four brothers, Edward, Philip, Robert, and Harry. Chin Lee and Yin Lan Ng immigrated from China to the United States city of Seattle, Washington in 1911.

Education 
On a scholarship, Boggs went on to study at Barnard College of Columbia University, where, through professor Paul Weiss, she says she was influenced by the writings of Kant and Hegel. She graduated in 1935 and then in 1940 received her Ph.D. in philosophy from Bryn Mawr College, where she wrote her dissertation on George Herbert Mead.

Partnership with James Boggs 
In 1953, Grace Lee Boggs married James Boggs, an American political activist and auto worker. They were married for 40 years until James Boggs' death in 1993. Together, they published activist literature, books, and founded the National Organization for an American Revolution (NOAR).

Ibram X. Kendi writes that together, Grace Lee Boggs and James Boggs "built a durable partnership that was at once marital, intellectual, and political. It was a genuine partnership of equals, remarkable not only for its unique pairing or for its longevity, but also for its capacity to continually generate theoretical reflection and modes of activist engagement."

Activism 
Facing significant barriers in the academic world in the 1940s, she took a low-paying job at the University of Chicago Philosophy Library. As a result of their activism on tenants' rights, she joined the revolutionary left Workers Party, known for its Third Camp position regarding the Soviet Union, which it saw as bureaucratic collectivist. At this point, she began the trajectory that she would follow for the rest of her life: a focus on struggles in the African-American community.

She met C. L. R. James during a speaking engagement in Chicago and moved to New York. She met many activists and cultural figures such as author Richard Wright and dancer Katharine Dunham. She also translated into English many of the essays in Karl Marx's Economic and Philosophical Manuscripts of 1844 for the first time. She soon joined the Johnson–Forest Tendency led by James, Raya Dunayevskaya and Lee. They focused more centrally on marginalized groups such as women, people of color and youth as well as breaking with the notion of the vanguard party. While originally operating as a tendency of the Workers Party, they briefly rejoined the Socialist Workers Party before leaving the Trotskyist left entirely. The Johnson–Forest Tendency also characterized the USSR as State Capitalist. She wrote for the Johnson–Forest Tendency under the party pseudonym Ria Stone. She married African-American auto worker and political activist James Boggs in 1953.

That same year she and James moved to Detroit, where they continued to focus on Civil Rights and Black Power Movement activism. As scholar Brian Doucet articulates in his interview conducted with Boggs in 2014, "Living in Detroit influenced the Boggs' thinking on the role of automation, capital flight, and racism." Boggs helped found the Detroit Asian Political Alliance in 1970.

When C. L. R. James and Raya Dunayevskaya split in the mid-1950s into Correspondence Publishing Committee led by James and News and Letters led by Dunayevskaya, Grace and James supported Correspondence Publishing Committee that James tried to advise while in exile in Britain. In 1962 the Boggses broke with James and continued Correspondence Publishing Committee along with Lyman Paine and Freddy Paine, while James' supporters, such as Martin Glaberman, continued on as a new if short-lived organization, Facing Reality. The ideas that formed the basis for the 1962 split can be seen as reflected in James Boggs's book, The American Revolution: Pages from a Black Worker's Notebook. Grace unsuccessfully attempted to convince Malcolm X to run for the United States Senate in 1964. In these years, Boggs wrote a number of books, including Revolution and Evolution in the Twentieth Century with her husband and focused on community activism in Detroit where she became a widely known activist.

In 1979, Grace Lee Boggs and husband James Boggs contributed to the founding of National Organization for an American Revolution (NOAR).

In the introduction to an extensive interview, scholar Karín Aguilar-San Juan describes one aspect of Boggs' activism: "Although she believes that racial and gender inequality will always demand struggle, Grace remains adamant that civil- rights- based activism will not lead to the farreaching changes in society that a higher state of human evolution requires." She goes on to explain that Boggs' "political path" has been "guided by her study of global and historical change, hand- in- hand with daily participation in and observation of the struggles of people at the grassroots level." In this interview Boggs discusses her relationship to her Asian American heritage, her experience with the Black Power movement, and many other topics.

She founded Detroit Summer, a multicultural intergenerational youth program, in 1992, and was the recipient of numerous awards. Additionally, Boggs' home in Detroit also serves as headquarters for the Boggs Center to Nurture Community Leadership. The Boggs Center was founded in the early 1990s by friends of Grace Lee and James Boggs and continues to be a hub for community-based projects, grassroots organizing, and social activism both locally and nationally.

Death 
Grace Lee Boggs died on October 5, 2015, at 100 years old. An obituary in the New York Times reported Boggs "waged war of inspiration for civil rights, labor, feminism, the environment and other causes for seven decades with an unflagging faith that revolutionary justice was around the corner."

President Barack Obama issued a statement on Bogg's death, praising her work for Detroit and for "her leadership in the civil rights movement, to her ideas that challenged us all to lead meaningful lives." He added that Boggs "understood the power of community organizing at its core."

Legacy

Honors 

 In 1999, Boggs was inducted into the National Women's Hall of Fame
 In 2013, The James and Grace Lee Boggs School was opened in Detroit, Michigan. The Boggs School teaches students from kindergarten to eighth grade, and among its core values are critical thinking, collaboration, and self-determination.
 In 2014, The Social Justice Hub at The New School’s newly opened University Center was named the Baldwin Rivera Boggs Center after activists Boggs, James Baldwin, and Sylvia Rivera.
 In 2014, Boggs was inducted into the Michigan Women's Hall of Fame.
 Boggs has received honorary doctorates from the University of Michigan, Wooster College, Kalamazoo College and Wayne State University.

Representation in media 
In Love And Struggle: The Revolutionary Lives of James and Grace Lee Boggs by Stephen M. Ward (The University of North Carolina Press, 2016)We Are Here: 30 Inspiring Asian Americans and Pacific Islanders Who Have Shaped the United States (by Naomi Hirahana) (Philadelphia: Running Press Kids, 2022

 Biopic 
American Revolutionary: The Evolution of Grace Lee Boggs, a 2013 biographical documentary on Lee Boggs life, activism and philosophy, directed by Grace Lee.

 Other 
 In Barry (2016), a drama film about Barack Obama's years at Columbia University, she is portrayed by Marion Kodama Yue.

Bibliography

 Books George Herbert Mead: Philosopher of the Social Individual (New York : King's Crown Press, 1945)
The Invading Socialist Society (with C.L.R. James and Raya Dunayevskaya) (1947)State Capitalism and World Revolution (with C. L. R. James and Raya Dunayevskaya) (1950).Facing Reality (with C. L. R. James and Cornelius Castoriadis). (Detroit: Correspondence, 1958).Revolution and Evolution in the Twentieth Century. (with James Boggs). (New York: Monthly Review Press, 1974).Women and the Movement to Build a New America (Detroit: National Organization for an American Revolution, 1977).Conversations in Maine: Exploring Our Nation's Future (with James Boggs, Freddy Paine, and Lyman Paine). (Boston: South End Press, 1978).Conditions of Peace: An Inquiry: Security, Democracy, Ecology, Economics, Community (Washington DC: Expro Press, 1991)Living for Change: An Autobiography (Minneapolis: University of Minnesota Press, 1998).
The Next American Revolution: Sustainable Activism for the Twenty-First Century (with Scott Kurashige). (Los Angeles: University of California Press, 2011)

 Interviews and appearances 

 In 2005, Boggs spoke at the Conference on Activism, Ethnic Studies, Diaspora and Beyond held at Northwestern University. The speech was which was later reprinted in CR: New Centennial Review.
 In 2012, her speech with Angela Davis at the Pauley Ballroom in University of California titled" On Revolution: A Conversation Between Grace Lee Boggs and Angela Davis" was excerpted in the journal Race, Poverty, and the Environment.See also
 History of Chinese Americans in Metro Detroit
 

References

 Further reading 
 "PBS Profile: Detroit 'Revolutionary' Grace Lee Boggs, 98", Deadline Detroit media, June 30, 2014.
Paul Buhle, "An Asian-American Tale", Monthly Review (January 1999), pp. 47–50.
 
Martin Glaberman, "The Revolutionary Optimist: Remembering C.L.R. James", Against the Current #72 (January/February 1998)
N.F. "Living for Change", Red & Black Notes, #7, Winter 1999.
Kaffer, Nancy. "Grace Lee Boggs, Detroit activist, dies at age 100" (Archive). Detroit Free Press, October 5, 2015.
 Ward, Stephen M. In Love and Struggle: The Revolutionary Lives of James and Grace Lee Boggs (Justice, Power, and Politics), The University of North Carolina Press, 2016. .

External links

The Boggs Center Home Page
The Grace Lee Boggs Archive

The James and Grace Lee Boggs Papers, archival collection at the Walter P. Reuther Library
Obituary by Christian Hogsbjerg in Socialist Review'', 407 (November 2015). 
Obituary on the World Socialist Web Site

1915 births
2015 deaths
20th-century American non-fiction writers
20th-century American women writers
21st-century American non-fiction writers
21st-century American women writers
Activists for African-American civil rights
American centenarians
American Marxists
American memoirists
American women memoirists
American political writers
American socialists
Women Marxists
American women's rights activists
American writers of Chinese descent
American anti-racism activists
Barnard College alumni
Michigan socialists
Rhode Island socialists
Writers from Detroit
Writers from Providence, Rhode Island
Women centenarians
American socialist feminists
American people of Chinese descent
American women writers of Chinese descent